Yoon Seok-ho (born 4 June 1957) is a South Korean television drama director.

He was the director of four TV series produced by KBS that are sometimes collectively referred to as Endless Love, each containing the name of one of the four seasons in its title.  The series were immensely popular throughout Asia, especially Winter Sonata, and intensified a surge in popularity of Korean popular culture known as Hallyu.

Profile 
Joined KBS in 1985
Worked as senior producer/production director for KBS
Current president of Yoon's Color Ltd.

Work 
Love Rain (KBS2, 2012)
Wedding Dress (KBS, 2009)
Endless Love
Spring Waltz (KBS, 2006)
Summer Scent (KBS, 2003)
Winter Sonata (KBS, 2002)
Autumn in My Heart (KBS, 2000)
Invitation (KBS, 1999)

Awards 
Best TV Director, 38th Baeksang Arts Awards (2002)
Drama Work Award, Korea Broadcasting Grand Awards
Merit Award from Kinema Junbo, Japan
Selected as the Person of the Year in 2004 by UNESCO Seoul Association

References 
Interview: Producer Yun Seok-ho, the creator of Yonsama and the "hallyu" frenzy (KBS Global, 2005-01-17)

External links 
 Profile (empas)
 Profile (epg)
 Article: 'Winter Sonata' Producer Readies New Drama (The Korea Times, 2005-04-18)

South Korean television directors
Yonsei University alumni
Konkuk University alumni
People from Seoul
1957 births
Living people